Lordy Tugade (born December 30, 1977 in Alaminos, Pangasinan) is a Filipino retired professional basketball player. He last played for the Powerade Tigers in the Philippine Basketball Association (PBA).

Known as the Alaminos Assassin for his three-point shooting, he played for the NU Bulldogs in the UAAP and the Red Bull Barako both in their PBL and PBA stints before being traded to San Miguel in October 2006.

Amateur career
During the late 1990s, Tugade joined up with fellow Pangasinense Danny Ildefonso to lead the NU Bulldogs to decent finishes in the UAAP. Tugade, then became NU's primary offense player after Ildefonso's departure to the PBL.

He later join the Red Bull Energy Drink squad in the Philippine Basketball League with Ildefonso and later Junthy Valenzuela, Jimwell Torion, Davonn Harp and Kerby Raymundo. Still, Red Bull failed to win a single title in the PBL.

PBA career

Red Bull Barako
In 2000, Red Bull moved up to the PBA ranks as its 10th member. Newly installed head coach Yeng Guiao, the same man who guided the PBL as its commissioner from 1997–99, picked Tugade as one of six direct-hire players from their amateur team.

He played a limited role during his first three seasons in the league and was instrumental in Red Bull's two title victories in the 2001 and 2002 Commissioner's Cup tournaments.

By the 2004-05 season, Tugade's role increased after the franchise retooled its lineup following losses to Davonn Harp, Willie Miller, and for a while, Mick Pennisi. Along with Enrico Villanueva both led Red Bull to a surprising semifinals appearance in the 2005 Fiesta Conference.

At the 2005 Fiesta Conference, through the effort of Tugade, Villanueva, the return of Pennisi, the acquisition of rookie shooting guard Larry Fonacier, the much-suited import James Penny, and the other tough players from the team, Red Bull won the Fiesta Conference crown and the club's first title in four years. In Game 2 against the Purefoods Chunkee Giants, Tugade outscored all locals with 30 points before eventually winning the championship. He was named the Finals Most Valuable Player for the first time in his PBA career.

The next conference, Tugade averaged 56.7 percent from the three-point distance, the highest of his career and became the league's leading three-point shooter during the 2006 Philippine Cup. The Bulls made it to the finals but lost to Purefoods in six games. At the end of the season, he ranked fourth in the MVP race and became part of the First Mythical Team selection for the first time in his career.

San Miguel Beermen
At the start of the 2006-07 PBA Philippine Cup, Tugade was sidelined with an injury and missed the first part of the conference. However, he was later traded to San Miguel in a three-way deal that also involved Rommel Adducul of the Barangay Ginebra Kings.

With a strong lineup, Tugade played a limited role for the Beermen as he was still recuperating from his injury while sharing minutes with Danny Seigle, Chris Calaguio and Dondon Hontiveros. He did posted significant numbers for San Miguel during their long eight-game winning streak.
Tugade is one of the PBA's best three point shooter along with James Yap, teammate Dondon Hontiveros and Jimmy Alapag.

Since 2008, Tugade has been plagued by injuries, playing only 64 games from 2008–11. Tugade's minutes also began to decrease in his tenure with San Miguel.

Final season and retirement

Tugade did not fully recover from his injuries but played all of the 32 games in the 2011 season. Tugade was traded to the Powerade along with Rabeh Al-Hussaini and Rey Guevarra before the start of the 2012 Governor's Cup, where he played only 10 games, again, because of injuries. At the end of the season, he decided to retire because of his injuries.

References

External links
 PBA.ph: Lordy Tugade Player Profile
 Lordy.co.nr-Unofficial Website of Lordy Tugade
 Basketball Exchange: PBA blockbuster deal lands Tugade, Adducul to SMB!
 PBA Box Score: February 20, 2000 Barangay Ginebra Kings vs Batang Red Bull Energy Kings

1977 births
Living people
Barako Bull Energy Boosters players
Basketball players from Pangasinan
Filipino men's basketball players
Philippine Basketball Association All-Stars
Powerade Tigers players
Shooting guards
Small forwards
NU Bulldogs basketball players